In political science, voter fatigue is a cause of voter apathy which results from the electorates of representative democracies being required to vote too often.  Voter fatigue and voter apathy should be distinguished from what arises when voters are not allowed or unable to vote, or when disenfranchisement occurs, or voters are engaged generally but repelled by the options available.

Description
Voter fatigue can be used as a criticism of the direct democracy system, in those specific situations in which voters are constantly asked to decide on policy via referendums (though it should be borne in mind that such situations may be practically rare) or an out-of-cycle recall election. The latter was seen in 2012 for instance, when the electorate of the American city of Sheboygan, Wisconsin had to vote two times out-of-cycle early in the year due to a mayoral recall primary and run-off election, and then an additional two times in mid-year due to the 2012 Wisconsin gubernatorial recall election. This was in addition to the usual winter primary and spring general election/presidential primary, and later fall primary and that year's United States presidential election, for a total of eight elections for the city in one year.

In the run-up to the 2019 UK General Election, it was suggested by some media outlets that the electorate would be suffering from voter fatigue, and that this would impact on the result of the ballot and could also affect turnout. For the UK electorate, this was the third General Election in little over 4 years, having seen one in 2015 and the snap election of 2017, either side of the 2016 EU Membership Referendum. In the event, the Conservatives' resounding victory was partly attributed to fatigue with the ongoing Brexit arrangements, which had been exacerbated by the 2017 result. Turnout in 2019 was only slightly down on that of 2017, suggesting that voter fatigue may not have played a significant role.

In Israel, political instability has led to some voter fatigue, with the country facing five snap elections to the Knesset in less than 4 years from 2019 to 2022.

Voter fatigue can be contributed to by a psychological phenomenon known as decision fatigue. As this suggests, our brain becomes mentally fatigued after making numerous decisions, so it will attempt to make shortcuts to decrease the workload. Elections, Referendums etc. require the voter to make a plethora of decisions in order to find the outcome best suiting them, hence decision fatigue, this then causes people to take the option to abstain. Abstentions are known to increase when the issues are more complicated, but on average, it is believed abstentions would fall around 6%-8% without decision fatigue. This is a difficult factor to control, or prevent, as it is ingrained in everyday life as much as it is in the political environment; all democratic votes require a decision of some description to be made, it is about how steps are made to reduce the effect of this factor.

However, proponents often counter that voter fatigue may be lessened by direct democracy, as voters will feel their vote has more effect.

Causes 
Voter fatigue can cause notoriously low voter turnout rates, and potentially more protest votes, and supposedly occurs for a variety of reasons:

 voters are not interested in the issue.
 voters are bothered by the inconvenience of physically voting.
 voters feel their vote will not count / the election has "already been won" by one side.
 voters feel that it is not worth their while to educate themselves as to the issues, and hence their vote would not be worth making. This is related to the concept of rational ignorance.
 voters have to vote for too many institutions (and/or too often).
 the issue does not affect voters directly.
 the issue does not affect voters within a perceived relevant period.
 voters have greater priorities than the issue; i.e. financial security.

Combating voter fatigue 
Amongst the methods that can be used to combat voter fatigue are:

 Making it mandatory to vote, as e.g. in Australia, Belgium, and Singapore
 Using sortition to choose those eligible to vote (thus increasing the worth of a single vote).
 E-democracy, proxy voting and delegated voting.
 Legislating that there are fixed terms for elections, to ensure that elections are not held too often, such as the United Kingdom's Fixed-term Parliaments Act with decrees that elections must be held every five years.

See also
 Donor fatigue, increased apathy about giving to charitable or humanitarian causes

References

Elections
Psychological attitude
Social emotions